Philaronia canadensis is a species of spittlebug in the family Aphrophoridae.

References

Articles created by Qbugbot
Insects described in 1929
Aphrophoridae